An election was held in Hamburg on 19 December 1982. The Social Democratic Party won unexpectedly against the Christian Democratic Union.

References

1982 elections in Germany
1980s in Hamburg
December 1982 events in Europe
1982